Tartus Governorate, also transliterated as Tartous Governorate, ( / ALA-LC: Muḥāfaẓat Ṭarṭūs) is one of the 14 governorates of Syria. It is situated in western Syria, bordering Latakia Governorate to the north, Homs and Hama Governorates to the east, Lebanon to the south, and the Mediterranean Sea to the west. It is one of the few governorates in Syria that has an Alawite majority. Sources list the area as 1,890 km² or 1,892 km², with its capital being Tartus.

History 
The governorate was historically part of the Alawite State, which existed from 1920–1936.

It was formerly part of Latakia governorate, but was split off circa 1972.

The region has been relatively peaceful during the Syrian civil war, being a generally pro-Assad region that had remained under government control. However in 2013 massacres against Sunni Muslims occurred in Bayda and Baniyas, and a suicide bombing claimed by Islamic State occurred in Tartus in May 2016. Tartus is home to a major Russian naval base.

Archeological sites
 Al-Kahf Castle – Isma'ili castle
 Aleika Castle – Isma'ili castle
 Amrit – Phoenician city
 Chastel Rouge (Qal’at Yahmur) – Crusader castle
 Hosn Suleiman
 Margat – Crusader castle
 Tell Kazel – Bronze age site (possibly the ancient city of Sumur)

Geography 
Tartus comprises roughly half of Syria's Mediterranean coastline; offshore lie five small islands, the largest of which is Arwad. Inland the terrain is mountainous, comprising a section of the Syrian Coastal Mountain Range (Nusayriyah Mountains). The Nahr al-Kabir river forms the border with Lebanon to the south.

Settlements
Tartus is the regional capital; other major settlements include Al-Hamidiyah, Al Qadmus, Al-Sawda, Ayn ash Shams, Baniyas,  Qusaybah and Safita.

Districts 

The governorate is divided into five districts (manatiq). The districts are further divided into 27 sub-districts (nawahi):

 Tartus District (7 sub-districts)
 Tartus Subdistrict
 Arwad Subdistrict
 Al-Hamidiyah Subdistrict
 Khirbet al-Maazah Subdistrict
 Al-Sawda Subdistrict
 Al-Karimah Subdistrict
 Al-Safsafah Subdistrict
 Baniyas District (7 sub-districts)
 Baniyas Subdistrict
 Al-Rawda Subdistrict
 Al-Annazah Subdistrict
 Al-Qadmus Subdistrict
 Hammam Wasel Subdistrict
 Al-Tawahin Subdistrict
 Talin Subdistrict

 Duraykish District (4 sub-districts)
 Duraykish Subdistrict
 Junaynet Ruslan Subdistrict
 Hamin Subdistrict
 Dweir Ruslan Subdistrict
 Safita District (6 sub-districts)
 Safita Subdistrict
 Mashta al-Helu Subdistrict
 Al-Bariqiyah Subdistrict
 Sebei Subdistrict
 Al-Sisiniyah Subdistrict
 Ras al-Khashufah Subdistrict
 Al-Shaykh Badr District (3 sub-districts)
 Al-Shaykh Badr Subdistrict
 Brummanet al-Mashayekh Subdistrict
 Al-Qamsiyah Subdistrict

Demographics 

As per the 2004 Syrian census the population was 701,400. A 2011 UNOCHA estimate put the population at 797,000, though this has likely changed since the start of the war.

The majority at 72% are Alawites, 7% Sunni Muslim, 8% Ismaili, and 13% Christian. There is a small Cretan Greek community concentrated in Al-Hamidiyah, the descendants of refugees who fled the Greco-Turkish War of 1897.

Gallery

References

External links
etartus The First Complete website for Tartus news and services

 
Governorates of Syria